The 15th TCA Awards were presented by the Television Critics Association in a ceremony hosted by Craig Kilborn that was held on July 23, 1999, at the Ritz-Carlton Huntington Hotel and Spa in Pasadena, Calif.

Winners and nominees

Multiple wins 
The following shows received multiple wins:

Multiple nominations 
The following shows received multiple nominations:

References

External links 
 Official website 
 1999 TCA Awards at IMDb.com

1999 television awards
1999 in American television
1999 in California
TCA Awards ceremonies